The Dead 60s is the eponymous debut album by British rock band The Dead 60s. It was first released in the United States on 31 May 2005. The office building on the album cover is Concourse House, which once stood next to Liverpool Lime Street railway station. It was demolished as part of a regeneration of the area surrounding the station.

Track listings
All tracks written by The Dead 60s.

US version ('Yellow Album')
"Riot Radio" – 2:22
"A Different Age" – 1:33
"Nowhere" – 3:13
"Red Light" – 3:07
"Just Another Love Song" – 3:10
"Control This" – 2:40
"Loaded Gun" – 2:47
"Nationwide" – 2:19
"We Get Low" – 3:41
"Horizontal" – 1:56
"New Town Disaster" – 3:08
"The Last Resort" – 2:54
"You're Not the Law" – 2:53
Bonus tracks on the Japan CD:
"Control This" [Dub]
"TV & Magazines"
"Cold Soul"

UK version ('Red Album')
"Riot Radio"
"A Different Age"
"Train to Nowhere"
"Red Light"
"We Get Low"
"Ghostfaced Killer"
"Loaded Gun"
"Control This"
"Soul Survivor"
"Nationwide"
"Horizontal"
"The Last Resort"
"You're Not the Law"

"Space Invader" Bonus Dub Album (by Central Nervous System)
"Too Much TV Dub"
"Invader Dub"
"D-60 Fights the Evil Force"
"No Control Dub"
"Tower Block Dub"
"CNS Lazer Attack D-60"
"Police Radio Dub"
"Flight Mission Dub"
"No Good Town Dub"
"Game Over"

Bonus DVD
A bonus, 3-video DVD was given out with initial sales of the American CD at indie record shops, and was also distributed at US gigs. It includes the music videos for the band's first 2 singles, plus a video montage of their Japan tour.
"Riot Radio"
"You're Not the Law"
"Japan in Dub"

"Riot Radio" is featured on the soundtrack of the video game Burnout Revenge and also on the soundtrack of the film Nick and Norah's Infinite Playlist

Album release details

Extended Copy Protection
In November 2005, it was revealed that the US CD contained Extended Copy Protection (XCP), a controversial feature that automatically installed rootkit software on any Microsoft Windows machine upon insertion of the disc. The CD was withdrawn and a new version without XCP was issued on 22 November 2005.

UK LP
Another product-related problem for the band was the mis-pressing of the UK vinyl album, which lists on both the label and sleeve the same track listing as the UK CD, but in fact plays the track listing of the US version. The LP was re-pressed and distributed with the same catalogue number. The original issue has a blue starburst sticker on the cover, and the reissue does not.

German re-release
In 2007 the album was re-released to include a remix of the song "Ghostfaced Killer". This version was used as the title track for the German comedy film Neues vom WiXXer.

Singles

References

External links
Sony BMG XCP Help Page.
Listen to samples of "The Dead 60s".

The Dead 60s albums
2005 debut albums
Epic Records albums